The Sierra de la Laguna pine–oak forests are a subtropical coniferous forest ecoregion, found in the Sierra de la Laguna mountain range at the southern tip of the Baja California Peninsula, Mexico.

It is found within Los Cabos Municipality and eastern La Paz Municipality of southern Baja California Sur state.

Setting
The pine–oak forests are found above  in elevation, and are surrounded at lower elevations by the Sierra de la Laguna dry forests. The pine–oak forests have a unique and diverse flora and fauna, including 694 plant species, of which approximately 85 are endemic.

Climate
The higher elevation gives the ecoregion a subtropical to temperate climate, in contrast to the dry tropical climate of the lowlands. Rainfall is higher than the lower-elevation dry forests and deserts of the peninsula, averaging 760 mm annually. Rain falls mostly in the summer, with occasional winter rains.

Flora

Mosses and lichens are abundant throughout.

Above  in elevation, the oak woodlands transition to oak-pine forests. The only pine present is an endemic subspecies of Mexican Pinyon, Pinus cembroides subsp. lagunae, mixed with oaks, including Quercus devia and Quercus tuberculata, and other broadleaf trees, including Arbutus peninsularis and Nolina beldingii. Lower trees and understory shrubs include Calliandra peninsularis, Mimosa xanti, Heterotoma aurita, Verbesina pustulata and Hypericum peninsulare. Above  in elevation, pine predominates, mixed with oaks, and with an understory of grasses (Muhlenbergia spp. and Festuca spp.).

Fauna
30 mammal species, 77 birds, 27 reptiles, 2 amphibians, and 108 species of arthropods inhabit the ecoregion.

Larger mammals include mule deer (Odocoileus hemionus), puma (Puma concolor), coyote (canis latrans), gray fox (Urocyon cinereoargenteus), bobcat (Lynx rufus), raccoon (Procyon lotor), ringtail (Bassariscus astutus), and western spotted skunk (Spilogale gracilis).

Resident birds include the cape pygmy owl (Glaucidium hoskinsii), white-winged dove (Zenaida asiatica), acorn woodpecker (Melanerpes formicivorus), and golden eagle (Aquila chrysaetos). Xantus's hummingbird (Basilinna xantusii) and the peninsular yellowthroat (Geothlypis beldingi) are endemic to the southern Baja California Peninsula.

Conservation and threats
WWF has designated the ecoregion as 'vulnerable'.

A 2017 assessment found that 670 km², or 63%, of the ecoregion is in protected areas.

In 2003, UNESCO designated a portion of the Sierra de la Laguna as a biosphere reserve. The reserve covers an area of 112,522 ha, of which 32,519 ha is designated the core area, centered on the pine-oak forests. A larger buffer area (80,003 ha) also includes lower-elevation dry forests and shrublands. The reserve is administered by Mexico's Comisión Nacional de Áreas Naturales Protegidas (CONANP).

See also
 List of ecoregions in Mexico
 
 Conifers of Mexico

External links

References

Ecoregions of Mexico
Forests of Mexico
Natural history of Baja California Sur
La Paz Municipality (Baja California Sur)
Los Cabos Municipality (Baja California Sur)

Montane forests
Neotropical ecoregions
Tropical and subtropical coniferous forests